Prose is a form of written or spoken language that follows the natural flow of speech, uses a language's ordinary grammatical structures, or follows the conventions of formal academic writing. It differs from most traditional poetry, where the form consists of verse (writing in lines) based on rhythmic metre or rhyme. The word "prose" first appears in English in the 14th century. It is derived from the Old French prose, which in turn originates in the Latin expression prosa oratio (literally, straightforward or direct speech).
Works of philosophy, history, economics, etc., journalism, and most fiction (an exception is the verse novel), are examples of works written in prose. Developments in twentieth century literature, including free verse, concrete poetry, and prose poetry, have led to the idea of poetry and prose as two ends on a spectrum rather than firmly distinct from each other. The British poet T. S. Eliot noted, whereas "the distinction between verse and prose is clear, the distinction between poetry and prose is obscure."

History

Latin was a major influence on the development of prose in many European countries. Especially important was the great Roman orator Cicero (106 – 43 BC). It was the lingua franca among literate Europeans until quite recent times, and the great works of Descartes (1596 – 1650), Francis Bacon (1561 – 1626), and Baruch Spinoza (1632 – 1677) were published in Latin. Among the last important books written primarily in Latin prose were the works of Swedenborg (d. 1772), Linnaeus (d. 1778), Euler (d. 1783), Gauss (d. 1855), and Isaac Newton (d. 1727).

Qualities 
Prose usually lacks the more formal metrical structure of the verses found in traditional poetry. It comprises full grammatical sentences (other than in stream of consciousness narrative), and paragraphs, whereas poetry often involves a metrical or rhyming scheme. Some works of prose make use of rhythm and verbal music. Verse is normally more systematic or formulaic, while prose is closer to both ordinary, and conversational speech.

In Molière's play Le Bourgeois gentilhomme the character Monsieur Jourdain asked for something to be written in neither verse nor prose, to which a philosophy master replies: "there is no other way to express oneself than with prose or verse", for the simple reason that "everything that is not prose is verse, and everything that is not verse is prose".

American novelist Truman Capote, in an interview, commented as follows on prose style:

Types 

Many types of prose exist, which include those used in works of nonfiction, prose poem, alliterative prose and prose fiction.

 A prose poem – is a composition in prose that has some of the qualities of a poem.
 Haikai prose – combines haiku and prose.
 Prosimetrum – is a poetic composition which exploits a combination of prose and verse (metrum); in particular, it is a text composed in alternating segments of prose and verse. It is widely found in Western and Eastern literature. 
 Purple prose – is prose that is so extravagant, ornate, or flowery as to break the flow and draw excessive attention to itself.

Divisions
Prose is divided into two main divisions:
Fiction
Non fiction

References

Further reading
 
 Patterson, William Morrison, Rhythm of Prose, Columbia University Press, 1917.
  244 pages.
  216 pages.

External links

Prose examples in Literature